Abanico Formation is a  thick sedimentary formation exposed in the Andes of Central Chile. The formation has been deposited in a timespan from the Eocene to the Miocene. Abanico Formation's contact with the overlying Miocene Farellones Formation has been the subject of differing interpretations since the 1960s. A small part of the formation crops out in the Mendoza Province of western Argentina.

Description 
The sediments accumulated in the Abanico Extensional Basin within a context of the Andean orogeny. The basin had a north-south elongated shape that spanned the latitudes of 29–38° S. Tectonic inversion from 21 to 16 million years ago made the basin collapse and the sediments to be incorporated to the Andean ranges. The northern part of the basin inverted before the southern part. Parts of the formation are known to have experienced Prehnite-pumpellyite facies metamorphism.

Paleontological significance 
The Tinguiririca fauna is known from the fossils found in the Abanico Formation near the Tinguiririca River. The rich faunal assemblage of the paleontological site, located in the La Gloria Member and dated at 33 to 31 Ma, gave name to the Tinguirirican South American land mammal age (SALMA), together with the Friasian named after the Río Frías Formation of the Aysén Region, the only ages defined in Chile.

Fossil content 
The following fossils have been recovered from the formation:

References

Bibliography

Further reading 
 Charrier, R., Bustamante, M., Comte, D., Elgueta, S., Flynn, J.J., Iturra, N., Muñoz, N., Pardo, M., Thiele, R. y Wyss, A.R. 2005. The Abanico Extensional Basin: regional extension, chronology of tectonic inversion, and relation to shallow seismic activity and Andean uplift. Neues Jahrbuch für Geologie und Paläontologie Abh. 236: 43-77
 J. J. Flynn and A. R. Wyss. 2004. A polydolopine marsupial skull from the Cachapoal Valley, Andean Main Range, Chile. Bulletin of the American Museum of Natural History 285:80-92
 J. J. Flynn, A. R. Wyss, R. Charrier and C. C. Swisher. 1995. An Early Miocene anthropoid skull from the Chilean Andes. Nature 373(6515):603-607
 Fock, A., Charrier, R., Farias, M. y Muñoz, M. 2006. Fallas de vergencia oeste en la Cordillera principal de Chile: inversión de la cuenca Abanico (33°-34°S). Asociación Geológica Argentina, Serie Publicación Especial 6: 48-55
 Godoy, E., Navarro, M. y Rivera, O. 1996. Zonas triangulares en el borde occidental de la Cordillera Principal (32°30'- 34°30' l.s.), Chile: Una solución a la paradoja Abanico - Farellones 13° Congreso Geológico Argentino y 3° Congreso de Exploración de Hidrocarburos, Actas 2: 373-381, Buenos Aires
 R. B. Hitz, J. J. Flynn, and A. R. Wyss. 2006. New Basal Interatheriidae (Typotheria, Notoungulata, Mammalia) from the Paleogene of Central Chile. American Museum Novitates 3520:1-32
 M. J. Novacek, A. R. Wyss, D. Frassinetti and P. Salinas. 1989. A new ?Eocene mammal fauna from the Andean Main Range. Journal of Vertebrate Paleontology 9(3 Supp.):34A
 Vergara, M.; Morata, D.; Villarroel, R.; Nyström, J.O.; Aguirre, L. 1999. 40Ar/39Ar ages, very low grade metamorphism and geochemistry of the volcanic rocks from “Cerro El Abanico”, Santiago Andean Cordillera (33º30’S-70º25’W). In International Symposium on Andean Geodynamics, No. 4, Extended Abstracts: 785-788. Göttingen
 A. R. Wyss, J. J. Flynn, C. C. Swisher, III, R. Charrier, and M. A. Norell. 1992. Fossil mammals from the central Chilean Andes: a new interval in the South American land mammal succession, and implications for Eocene-Oligocene events and Andean tectonics. Abstracts and Program, Fifth North American Paleontological Convention 318

Geologic formations of Chile
Eocene Series of South America
Oligocene Series of South America
Miocene Series of South America
Paleogene Chile
Neogene Chile
Geologic formations of Argentina
Paleogene Argentina
Neogene Argentina
 
Rupelian Stage
Priabonian Stage
Fossiliferous stratigraphic units of South America
Paleontology in Chile
Geology of O'Higgins Region
Geology of Santiago Metropolitan Region
Geology of Valparaíso Region
Geology of Mendoza Province